Zhang Meiyuan (born November 1937) is a major general in the People's Liberation Army of China who served as commander of the 38th Group Army from 1989 to 1994 and commander of the  from 1993 to 1996.

He was a member of the 14th Central Committee of the Chinese Communist Party.

Biography
Zhang was born in Bazhong County (now Bazhong), Sichuan, in November 1937. He enlisted in the People's Liberation Army (PLA) in January 1955, and joined the Chinese Communist Party (CCP) in August 1958. He graduated from the PLA Jinzhou Infantry School and the PLA Military Academy.

Zhang was promoted to deputy commander of the People's Liberation Army in 1987. In June 1989, he was promoted again to become commander, succeeding Xu Qinxian, who was court-martialed, jailed for five years and expelled from the CCP due to refuse the order to use force against demonstrators in Beijing during the 1989 Tiananmen Square protests and massacre. He led his men to suppress the students in Beijing, which played an important role in the 1989 Tiananmen Square protests and massacre. For his gallant service at the 1989 Tiananmen Square protests and massacre, he was admitted to member of the 14th Central Committee of the Chinese Communist Party in October 1992. In May 1996, he was appointed deputy chief of staff of the Lanzhou Military Region, in addition to serving as deputy secretary of the Discipline Inspection Commission.

He attained the rank of major general (shaojiang) in September 1988.

References

1937 births
Living people
People from Bazhong
People's Liberation Army generals from Sichuan
People's Republic of China politicians from Sichuan
Chinese Communist Party politicians from Sichuan
Members of the 14th Central Committee of the Chinese Communist Party